The Honda CB150R Streetfire is a CB series  single-cylinder standard/naked bike made by Astra Honda Motor in Indonesia since late 2012. It is positioned above the more economical Verza in Astra Honda Motor's sport motorcycles lineup.



History 
The CB150R was introduced by Honda at the Jakarta Motorcycle Show in November 2012. The first model was sold from December 2012 until August 2015, before the second model arrived. The second model was introduced along with the Sonic 150R underbone. This model is equipped with a newer engine configuration. In July 2018, the CB150R received a minor cosmetic update.

2012–2015 

In November 2012, the CB150R was introduced at the Jakarta Motorcycle Show. The bike shared its engine with the CBR150R, but with a different tuning and mounted in a diamond truss frame. The engine is claimed to have a maximum power output of  @ 10,000 rpm and maximum torque of  @ 8,000 rpm.

Performance

2015–present 
In August 2015, Astra Honda Motor released a fully updated version of the CB150R, along with the Sonic 150R. Updates includes newer engine configuration, different body design, all-LED lighting system, and all-digital instrument panel design.

In July 2018, the CB150R got a minor update. This update includes a slightly reworked bodywork, updated undercowl design (SE variant only), detachable aluminium rear footstep, wavy disc brake, revised handlebar position and an addition of passing lamp button.

In May 2021, the CB150R is equipped with inverted front suspension fork as standard.

Performance 
Some performance tests listed here were conducted by Otomotif tabloid from Indonesia in September 2015.

Specifications

References 

2022 Honda CB150R

External links 

 

CB150R
Standard motorcycles
Motorcycles introduced in 2012